1429 Pemba, provisional designation , is a stony background asteroid from the central regions of the asteroid belt, approximately 10 kilometers in diameter. It was discovered on 2 July 1937, by South African astronomer Cyril Jackson at the Union Observatory in Johannesburg. The asteroid was named for the Pemba Island off the coast of Tanzania.

Orbit and classification 

Pemba is a non-family asteroid from the main belt's background population. It orbits the Sun in the central main-belt at a distance of 1.7–3.4 AU once every 4 years and 1 month (1,492 days). Its orbit has an eccentricity of 0.33 and an inclination of 8° with respect to the ecliptic. The body's observation arc begins with its official discovery observation at Johannesburg.

Physical characteristics 

Pemba is an assumed stony S-type asteroid.

Rotation period 

In September 1982, a rotational lightcurve of Pemba was obtained from photometric observations. Analysis of the fragmentary lightcurve gave a rotation period of 20 hours with a brightness amplitude of 0.3 magnitude. As of 2017, no secure period has been determined.

Diameter and albedo 

According to the surveys carried out by the Japanese Akari satellite and the NEOWISE mission of NASA's Wide-field Infrared Survey Explorer, Pemba measures between 8.71 and 10.75 kilometers in diameter and its surface has an albedo between 0.1316 and 0.196.

The Collaborative Asteroid Lightcurve Link adopts Petr Pravec's revised WISE results, that is, an albedo of 0.1316 and a diameter of 10.37 kilometers based on an absolute magnitude of 12.74.

Naming 

This minor planet was named for the Pemba Island, Tanzania, part of the Zanzibar Archipelago, which was once under the rule of the Sultan of Zanzibar. It is located off the East Coast of Africa in the Indian Ocean. The official  was published by the Minor Planet Center in April 1953.

References

External links 
 Asteroid Lightcurve Database (LCDB), query form (info )
 Dictionary of Minor Planet Names, Google books
 Asteroids and comets rotation curves, CdR – Observatoire de Genève, Raoul Behrend
 Discovery Circumstances: Numbered Minor Planets (1)-(5000) – Minor Planet Center
 
 

001429
Discoveries by Cyril Jackson (astronomer)
Named minor planets
19370702